Robert Goforth (born February 27, 1976) is an American politician and pharmacist who served as a member of the Kentucky House of Representatives for the 89th district from 2018 to 2021.

Early life and education 
Goforth is from East Bernstadt, Kentucky. He earned a bachelor's degree from the University of Kentucky and a Doctor of Pharmacy from MCPHS University.

Career 
Goforth served as a combat engineer in the United States Army from 1994 to 1996. He was first elected to the Kentucky House in February 2018. Goforth challenged incumbent Republican governor Matt Bevin in the 2019 gubernatorial election, getting roughly 40 percent of the vote in the primary election.

Goforth sought re-election despite his indictment, and was condemned by a number of pro-family groups, including Kentucky for Strong Families. He was re-elected in 2020 with 70% of the vote. He resigned from office in August 2021, while still facing charges.

Personal life 
In April 2020, Goforth was arrested on charges relating to domestic violence. The Laurel County Sheriff's Office charged Goforth with first-degree strangulation, fourth-degree domestic assault and third-degree terroristic threatening for physically assaulting his wife, attempting to hog-tie her and strangling her with an Ethernet cord. He was taken to the Laurel County Detention Center. In September 2020, Goforth was indicted on one count of first-degree strangulation and one count of assault in the fourth degree.

In May 2022 Goforth was convicted of fraud.

References

External links

Living people
People from Laurel County, Kentucky
University of Kentucky alumni
MCPHS University alumni
American pharmacists
Republican Party members of the Kentucky House of Representatives
21st-century American politicians
Year of birth missing (living people)
Kentucky politicians convicted of crimes
1976 births